Telmatophilus caricis  is a species of silken fungus beetle native to Europe.

References

External links
 Images representing Telmatophilus at BOLD

Cryptophagidae
Beetles described in 1790
Beetles of Europe